Homstølvatnet or Eptevatn is a lake in the far western part of the municipality of Froland in Agder county, Norway. The lake was expanded in 1973 when a dam was built at the south end of the lake Eptevatn for the purposes of hydroelectric power generation. The dam made the lake larger so that it now includes the formerly separate lake Homstølvatnet as one large lake.

See also
List of lakes in Aust-Agder
List of lakes in Norway

References

Lakes of Agder
Froland